Arthur Savage may refer to:

A. H. Savage (Arthur Henry Patrick Savage, 1850–1905), 19th century footballer
Arthur William Savage (1857–1938), late 19th century gun designer, and inventor of radial tires